German submarine U-419 was a Type VIIC U-boat of Nazi Germany's Kriegsmarine during World War II.

She carried out one patrol. She was a member of one wolfpack. She did not sink or damage any ships.

She was sunk by a British aircraft in mid-Atlantic on 8 October 1943.

Design
German Type VIIC submarines were preceded by the shorter Type VIIB submarines. U-419 had a displacement of  when at the surface and  while submerged. She had two shafts and two  propellers.

U-419 was fitted with five  torpedo tubes (four fitted at the bow and one at the stern), fourteen torpedoes, one  SK C/35 naval gun, 220 rounds, and two twin  C/30 anti-aircraft guns. The boat had a complement of between forty-four and sixty.

Service history
The submarine was laid down on 7 November 1941 at the Danziger Werft (yard) at Danzig (now Gdansk), as yard number 120, launched on 22 August 1942 and commissioned on 18 November under the command of Oberleutnant zur See Dietrich Giersberg.

She served with the 8th U-boat Flotilla from 18 November 1942 and the 11th flotilla from 1 August 1943.

Patrol and loss
The boat's only patrol was preceded by a trip from Kiel in Germany to Bergen in Norway. U-419 then left Bergen on 13 September 1943 and headed for the Atlantic Ocean via the gap between Iceland and the Faroe Islands. On 8 October, she was attacked and sunk by depth charges dropped by a British B-24 Liberator of No. 86 Squadron RAF.

Forty-eight men went down with the U-boat; there was one survivor.

Wolfpacks
U-419 took part in one wolfpack, namely:
 Rossbach (24 September – 8 October 1943)

References

Bibliography

External links

German Type VIIC submarines
U-boats commissioned in 1942
U-boats sunk in 1943
U-boats sunk by British aircraft
U-boats sunk by depth charges
1942 ships
Ships built in Danzig
World War II shipwrecks in the Atlantic Ocean
World War II submarines of Germany
Maritime incidents in October 1943